Cladonia inflata is a rare species of terricolous (ground-dwelling) lichen in the family Cladoniaceae. Found in Bahia, Brazil, it was formally described as a new species in 2018 by lichenologists André Aptroot and Marcela Eugenia da Silva Cáceres. Cladonia inflata is only known to occur at the type locality, and is only known from the type specimen. At this location the lichen is conspicuous but not abundant, and forms extensive mats with many other Cladonia species, such as C. bahiana, C. clathrata, C. dissecta, C. divaricata, C. friabilis, C. furfuracea, C. metaminiata, C. miniata, C. obscurata, C. parvipes, C. pityrophylla, C. polyscypha, C. salmonea, C. secundana, and C. substellata. It contains the secondary compound fumarprotocetraric acid. The specific epithet inflata refers to the inflated thallus of the lichen.

See also
List of Cladonia species

References

inflata
Lichen species
Lichens described in 2018
Lichens of Northeast Brazil
Taxa named by André Aptroot
Taxa named by Marcela Cáceres